Mesaad Ali Al-Hamad (born February 11, 1986) is a Qatari footballer who plays as a right defender . He is a member of the Qatar national football team. He was born in Qatar.

Club career statistics
Statistics accurate as of 21 August 2011

1Includes Emir of Qatar Cup.
2Includes Sheikh Jassem Cup.
3Includes AFC Champions League.

References

External links

Player Tactical Profile at football-lineups.com
Player profile - doha-2006.com

1986 births
Living people
Qatari footballers
Qatar international footballers
Al Sadd SC players
Al Ahli SC (Doha) players
Umm Salal SC players
Al-Wakrah SC players
Al-Shahania SC players
Muaither SC players
Yemeni emigrants to Qatar
2007 AFC Asian Cup players
2011 AFC Asian Cup players
Qatar Stars League players
Qatari Second Division players
Naturalised citizens of Qatar
Asian Games medalists in football
Footballers at the 2006 Asian Games
Asian Games gold medalists for Qatar
Association football defenders
Medalists at the 2006 Asian Games